Dinkelacker is a brand of German beer brewed in Stuttgart, Germany.

The Dinkelacker brewery was founded by Carl Dinkelacker in Stuttgart's Tübinger Straße in 1888. The company still brews at that location. By the end of the 19th century Dinkelacker was the largest brewery in Stuttgart.

Dinkelacker is German for "field of spelt".

See also
 Beer festival

References

External links 

Brewery website

1888 establishments in Germany
Beer brands of Germany
Breweries in Germany
Breweries in Baden-Württemberg
Stuttgart
Manufacturing companies based in Stuttgart
Food and drink companies established in 1888
19th-century establishments in Württemberg
German companies established in 1888